The 38th Annual GMA Dove Awards were held on April 25, 2007 recognizing accomplishments of musicians for the year 2006. The show was held at the Grand Ole Opry House in Nashville, Tennessee, and was hosted by Brian Littrell, Natalie Grant, and Donnie McClurkin. This was the first year in which the awards were called the "GMA Dove Awards" since the 2006 edition was called the "GMA Music Awards".

Nominations were announced earlier on February 20, 2007 by Juanita Bynum, Brian Littrell and Thor Ramsey at the Hilton Nashville Downtown in Music City, Tennessee.

Following the success from the previous year, Chris Tomlin won six awards, including Artist of the Year and Male Vocalist of the Year. Aaron Shust won three awards, including New Artist of the Year. Casting Crowns, Jars of Clay, KJ-52, Gaither Vocal Band, and The Lewis Family each won two awards.

Performers

Telecast ceremony
The following performed:

Presenters

Telecast ceremony
The following presented:

Michael W. Smith
Brenda Lee
Bob & Larry

Awards

General
Artist of the Year
Casting Crowns
Chris Tomlin
Jars of Clay
Stellar Kart
The Crabb Family
Third Day
TobyMac

New Artist of the Year
Aaron Shust
Ayiesha Woods
DecembeRadio
Leeland
Pocket Full of Rocks

Group of the Year
BarlowGirl
Casting Crowns
David Crowder Band
Jars of Clay
Diante do Trono
MercyMe

Male Vocalist of the Year
Aaron Shust
Chris Tomlin
Jeremy Camp
Jason Crabb
Mark Hall
Mat Kearney

Female Vocalist of the Year
Christy Nockels
Krystal Meyers
Natalie Grant
Nichole Nordeman
Rebecca St. James

Song of the Year
 "Bless the Broken Road" – Selah
Marcus Hummon, Bobby E. Boyd, Jeff Hanna, songwriters
 "Cry Out To Jesus" – Third Day
Mac Powell, songwriter
 "In the Father's Arms" – Diante do Trono
Ana Paula Valadão, songwriter
 "Drifter" – DecembeRadio
Josh Reedy, Brian Bunn, Erik Miker, Boone Daughdrill, songwriter
 "God's Still God" – Young Harmony
Jonathan Bond, songwriter
 "Imagine Me" – Kirk Franklin
Kirk Franklin, songwriter
 "Made to Worship" – Chris Tomlin
Stephan Sharp, Ed Cash, Chris Tomlin, songwriters
 "Me and Jesus" – Stellar Kart
Adam Agee, Ian Eskelin, songwriters
 "My Savior My God" – Aaron Shust
Dorothy Greenwell, songwriter
 "Nothing Left To Lose" – Mat Kearney
Mat Kearney, songwriter
 "Praise You in This Storm" – Casting Crowns
Mark Hall, Bernie Herms, songwriters

Songwriter of the Year
Aaron Shust

Producer of the Year
Brown Bannister
Ed Cash
Ian Eskelin
Nathan Nockels
Otto Price

Pop
Pop/Contemporary Recorded Song of the Year
 "Bless the Broken Road" – Selah
 "Broken & Beautiful" – Mark Schultz 
 "Dead Man" – Jars of Clay
 "Made to Worship" – Chris Tomlin
 "My Savior My God" – Aaron Shust
 "Praise You in This Storm" – Casting Crowns

Pop/Contemporary Album of the Year
 Between the Dreaming and the Coming True – Bebo Norman
 Broken & Beautiful – Mark Schultz
 Coming Up To Breathe – MercyMe
 Nothing Left to Lose – Mat Kearney
 See The Morning – Chris TomlinRockRock Recorded Song of the Year "Activate" – Stellar Kart
 "Breathe Into Me" – Red "Dangerous" – DecembeRadio 
 "Good Behavior" – Plumb
 "Rebirthing" – SkilletRock/Contemporary Recorded Song of the Year "Cut" – Plumb 
 "I'm Not Alright" – Sanctus Real
 "Me and Jesus" – Stellar Kart "Sound of Melodies" – Leeland
 "Work" – Jars of ClayRock Album of the Year Business Up Front Party in the Back – Family Force 5
 Comatose – Skillet
 DecembeRadio – DecembeRadio End of Silence – Red
 Smile, It's the End of the World – Hawk NelsonRock/Contemporary Album of the Year Good Monsters – Jars of Clay Hearts of the Innocent – Kutless
 Sound of Melodies – Leeland
 The Face of Love – Sanctus Real
 We Can't Stand Sitting Down – Stellar Kart

Rap/Hip-HopRap/Hip-Hop Recorded Song of the Year "Gotta Notice" – Flame 
 "Jesus Muzik" – Lecrae (featuring Trip Lee)
 "Let's Go" – Gospel Gangstaz
 "Never Look Away" – KJ-52 (featuring Brynn Sanchez) "Skills" – ManafestRap/Hip-Hop Album of the Year After the Music Stops – Lecrae
 Glory – Manafest
 Pro + Pain – Mars Ill
 KJ-52 Remixed – KJ-52 The Flood – Gospel Gangstaz

InspirationalInspirational Recorded Song of the Year "Behold The Lamb" – David Phelps
 "Completely" – Ana Laura
 "Find Your Wings" – Mark Harris "Glory" – Selah (featuring Nichole Nordeman)
 "Orphans of God" – AvalonInspirational Album of the Year A Grateful People – Watermark
 A Greater Song – Paul Baloche
 Bless the Broken Road: The Duets Album – Selah Blur the Lines – The Crabb Family
 Legacy of Love...David Phelps Live – David Phelps

GospelSouthern Gospel Recorded Song of the Year "Give It Away" – Gaither Vocal Band "God's Still God" – Young Harmony
 "New Day Dawning" – The Whisnants
 "Nothing But The Blood" – The Crabb Family
 "Prodigal's Dad" – Kenny BishopSouthern Gospel Album of the Year Give It Away – Gaither Vocal Band Graceland – The Mike Bowling Group
 He's So God – Brian Free and Assurance
 Stepping Stones – Poet Voices
 Strength – Young HarmonyTraditional Gospel Recorded Song of the Year "All Because of Jesus" – Andraé Crouch
 "Call Him Jesus" – Mary Mary
 "Can't Nobody Do Me Like Jesus" – The Crabb Family "Look Where You Brought Me From" – Clarence Fountain and the Blind Boys of Alabama, with Sam Butler, Jr.
 "Miracles Still Happen" – Stephanie DotsonTraditional Gospel Album of the Year A New Beginning – Bishop Eddie Long & The New Birth Total Praise Choir
 Clarence Fountain and The Blind Boys of Alabama With Sam Butler, Jr. – Sam Butler, Clarence Fountain and The Blind Boys of Alabama
 Mighty Wind – Andraé Crouch Paved The Way – The Caravans
 Sing to the Lord A New Song – Alabama SpiritualsContemporary Gospel Recorded Song of the Year "Favor" – Karen Clark-Sheard
 "No Limits" – Martha Munizzi
 "This Too Shall Pass" – Yolanda Adams
 "Turn It Around" – Israel & New Breed "You Know Me" – George HuffContemporary Gospel Album of the Year Feels Good – Take 6
 Free to Worship – Fred Hammond
 It's Not Over – Karen Clark–Sheard Life Changing – Smokie Norful
 No Limits Live – Martha Munizzi

Country and BluegrassCountry Recorded Song of the Year "Don't Let Who You Are Keep You Away" – Kenny Bishop
 "It Ain't Over When It's Over" – The Mike Bowling Group
 "Jonah, Job And Moses" – The Oak Ridge Boys "On The Other Side of That Hill" – Barbara Fairchild
 "Say Hello To Heaven" – Jamie SlocumCountry Album of the Year Everyday – Mark Bishop
 Feels Like Home – Dave Moody
 He Kept on Loving Me – Barbara Fairchild
 Precious Memories – Alan Jackson Songs of Inspiration – AlabamaBluegrass Recorded Song of the Year "Bedside Prayer" – The Churchmen
 "Did You Forget God Today" – The Grascals
 "If I Could Hear My Mother Pray Again" – Dave Moody
 "My Cross" – The Lewis Family "We Know Where He Is" – Del McCoury BandBluegrass Album of the Year Acoustic Hymns Volume 1 – Cumberland Quartet
 Ancient of Days – Harvest Wind
 Flyin' High – The Lewis Family He Lives in Me – Doyle Lawson & Quicksilver
 The Promised Land – Del McCoury Band

Praise and WorshipWorship Song of the Year "Holy Is the Lord" – Chris Tomlin Chris Tomlin, Louie Giglio, songwriters "Made to Worship" – Chris Tomlin
 Stephan Sharp, Ed Cash, Chris Tomlin, songwriters
 "My Savior My God" – Aaron Shust
 Aaron Shust, Dorothy Greenwell, songwriters
 "In The Father's Arms" – Diante do Trono
 Ana Paula Valadão, songwriter
 "Our God Reigns" – Brandon Heath
 Brandon Heath, songwriter
 "Yes You Have" – Leeland
 Leeland Dayton Mooring, Jack Anthony Mooring, Matt Bronleewe, songwritersPraise & Worship Album of the Year A Grateful People – Watermark
 See the Morning – Chris Tomlin Song to the King – Pocket Full of Rocks
 In The Father's Arms – Diante do Trono
 Sound of Melodies – Leeland
 Top of My Lungs – Phillips, Craig & Dean

Children's MusicChildren's Music Album of the Year Absolute Modern Worship for Kids Yellow
 Cedarmont Worship For Kids 3 – Cedarmont Kids
 Here I Am To Worship Kids 3
 Sing Over Me Worship Songs And Lullabies – Bethany Dillon, Erin O'Donnell, Christy Nockels, Nichole Nordeman, and Janna Long 
 Veggie Tales Worship Songs – VeggieTales, featuring Matt RedmanUrbanUrban Recorded Song of the Year "Follow Me" – Virtue
 "I Get Joy" – Coko
 "Imagine Me" – Kirk Franklin "Victory" – Tye Tribbett and G.A.
 "Why Me" – Kierra SheardUrban Album of the Year Grateful – Coko
 Tales From The Badlands – Liquid
 Testimony – Virtue
 This Is Me – Kierra Sheard This Is Who I Am – Kelly Price

OthersInstrumental Album of the Year 20 Contemporary Hymn Favorites For Solo Piano – John E. Coates
 Breathe–Piano – Tom Howard
 End of the Spear Soundtrack – Various artists
 Guitars in Worship – Dave Cleveland
 Sunday Morning Jams Vol. 2 – Quiet Time PlayersSpanish Language Album of the Year Alegria – Marcos Witt
 En El Lugar Secreto – Blest
 Mi Alma Te Alaba – Alan Villatoro
 En los Brazos del Padre – Diante do Trono
 Si Alguna Vez – Alejandra Un Dia Mas – Daniel CalvettiSpecial Event Album of the Year Arise: A Celebration of Worship (Integrity Music)
 Bluegrass Gospel Time
 Passion: Everything Glorious (Sixsteps Records) Freaked! A Gotee Tribute to dcTalk's Jesus Freak (Gotee Records)
 Torch: A Live Celebration of Southern Gospel's Next Generation (Daywind Records)Christmas Album of the Year A Christmas Homecoming – Cumberland Quartet
 A Mary Mary Christmas – Mary Mary
 Christmas Offerings – Third Day Do You See What I See? – Todd Agnew
 The Christmas Hope – NewSongChoral Collection of the Year Again I Say Rejoice: Celebrating The Songs Of Israel Houghton – Various artists
 Dwell – Robert Sterling
 I'm Amazed – Carol Cymbala Invisible Christ – Church Prayz Choir
 You Are God Alone – Phil Barfoot and Lari GossRecorded Music Packaging of the Year And the Land of Fake Believe – Eleventyseven
 Beyond Measure – Jeremy Camp Hearts of the Innocent – Kutless
 My Island – Starflyer 59
 Say No More – House of Heroes
 Smile, It's the End of the World – Hawk Nelson

MusicalsMusical of the YearChristmas Is ForeverEverything Glorious
He's Alive Forever
How Great Is Our God
My Savior, My God

Youth/Children's Musical
A King Is Coming to Town
Donkey Tales
Miracle on Main Street
The First Action Heroes
Voyage of Friendship

Videos
Short Form Music Video of the Year
"Breathe into Me" – Red
 Matt Bass (video director), Steven Johnson (video producer)
"This House" – Edison Glass
JT Daly (video director and producer)
"Welcome Home" – Brian Littrell
Roman White (video director), Randy Brewer (video producer)
 "Work" – Jars of Clay
Jeff Stephenson (video director), Monica Ortiz (video producer)
"Writing on the Walls" – Underoath
Popcore Films (video director and producer)

Long Form Music Video of the Year
  Alive in South Africa – Israel & New Breed
Israel Houghton; Di Rosen; Di Rosen Productions; Integrity Music
 Give It Away – Gaither Vocal Band
Doug Stuckey (video director), Bill Gaither, Barry Jennings, and Bill Carter (video producers)
 Live Unplugged – Jeremy Camp
Carl Diebold (video director), Ken Concord and Michael Sacci (video producers)
 Legacy of Love... David Phelps Live – David Phelps 
Russell E. Hall (video director), David Phelps and Jim Chaffee (video producers)
 Lifesong Live – Casting Crowns
 Karl Hortsmann (video producer)
 Time Again... Amy Grant Live – Amy Grant
 Ken Carpenter (video director), Ken & Rod Carpenter (video producers)

Artists with multiple nominations and awards 

The following artists received multiple nominations:
 Nine: Chris Tomlin
 Six: Jars of Clay
 Five: The Crabb Family, Diante do Trono, Aaron Shust, Leeland
 Four: Casting Crowns, Stellar Kart, and Israel Houghton
 Three: Third Day, Mat Kearney, DecembeRadio, Jeremy Camp
 Two: MercyMe, Mark Hall

The following artists received multiple awards:
 Six: Chris Tomlin
 Three: Aaron Shust
 Two: Casting Crowns, Jars of Clay, KJ-52, Gaither Vocal Band, The Lewis Family

References

External links
Official Result at official website
GMA Dove Awards IN THE PRESS ROOM / ThoughtQuotient Video Podcast
38th Annual GMA Awards Nominations & Winners on About.com
38th Annual GMA Dove Awards Album of the Year Nominations & Winners on About.com
38th Annual GMA Dove Awards Songs of the Year Nominations & Winners on About.com

2007 music awards
GMA Dove Awards
2007 in American music
2007 in Tennessee
GMA